Strack is a German language surname. It may refer to:

Adriano Strack (born 1992), Brazilian football player
Charles Strack (1899–1967), American wrestler
Danny Strack (born 1979), American poet
Dave Strack (1923–2014), American basketball coach
Dieter Strack (born 1950), German basketball player
Friedrich Strack (1781–1852), German naturalist
Fritz Strack (born 1950), German psychologist
Gerhard Strack (born 1955), German football player
Günter Strack (1929–1999), German actor
Hermann Strack (1848–1922), German theologian
Heinrich Strack (1805–1880), German architect

See also 
 Stracke

German-language surnames
Surnames from nicknames